Jõeküla is a village in Hiiumaa Parish, Hiiu County in northwestern Estonia.

The village is first mentioned in 1726 (Bach-Dorff). Historically, the village was part of Vaemla Manor.

Vaemla River flows through the village.

In 1977, Pasti village was merged into Jõeküla.

References

Villages in Hiiu County